Beckville is an unincorporated community in Walnut Township, Montgomery County, in the U.S. state of Indiana.

History
Beckville was founded in 1828. The community was named for Solomon Beck, the original owner of the town site. A post office was established at Beckville in 1854, and remained in operation until it was discontinued in 1865.

Geography

References

Unincorporated communities in Montgomery County, Indiana
Unincorporated communities in Indiana